On January 12, 1826, Patrick Farrelly (J) of  died in office.  A special election was held to fill the resulting vacancy

Election results

Sill took his seat April 3, 1826, during the First Session.

See also
List of special elections to the United States House of Representatives

References

Pennsylvania 1826 18
Pennsylvania 1826 18
1826 18
Pennsylvania 18
United States House of Representatives 18
United States House of Representatives 1826 18